Rebirth is the eighth studio album by American singer Keith Sweat. It was released by Elektra Records on August 13, 2002 in the United States.

Critical reception

Allmusic editor John Bush found that "it's not really a creative reawakening since he hasn't changed anything about his game. In the end, Rebirth is really just another Keith Sweat album, and it's a tribute to one of the leading soul men of the '80s and '90s that he can continue making records as smooth and as vigorous as this one 15 years down the road [...] Sweat is still in great voice, and it's his personality that carries Rebirth, even when it sounds similar to his work in the past."

Track listing

Personnel

 Keith Sweat – vocals, producer, executive producer, vocal arrangement
 Fitzgerald Scott – keyboards, background vocals, producer, drum programming
 Roy "Royalty" Hamilton – background vocals, producer, executive producer
 Merlin Bobb – executive producer, Associate executive producer
 Chanz – keyboards, background vocals, producer, drum programming

 Al E. Cat – keyboards, background vocals, drum programming
 Lade Bac – vocals, background vocals
 Se7en – Guitar, keyboards, drum programming
 Clarence "Kage" Holmes – producer, drum programming
 Zack Odom – recording engineer

Charts

References

2002 albums
Keith Sweat albums
Elektra Records albums